"Kanga" (stylized in all caps) is a song by American rapper 6ix9ine from his debut studio album, Dummy Boy (2018). It features rap artist Kanye West. 6ix9ine teases his signature catchphrase in the song.

Composition
The song was solely produced by Murda Beatz. Though 6ix9ine only uses his signature catchphrase "It's fucking Tr3yway" once on the album, he teases it in the song with the lyrics: "How Ye? How Ye? How, Sway? Nigga, it's fucking...". "Fefe" is the only song he says it in on the album, which was released as a single at a previous date and the reasoning behind this is that 6ix9ine had actually been banned from using his catchphrase on Dummy Boy.

Reception
HotNewHipHop described it as: 'a club banger [that's] bound to get everybody moving.' The track was viewed by Consequence of Sound as being one of the album's songs where: [the] musicality of [6ix9ine's] rhymes [shine] on'.

Commercial performance
"Kanga" charted at number 7 on the US Billboard Bubbling Under Hot 100 upon the release of Dummy Boy and remained on it for two weeks. Alongside this, the song debuted on US Bubbling Under R&B/Hip-Hop Singles chart at number 1.

Charts

References

2018 songs
6ix9ine songs
Kanye West songs
Song recordings produced by Murda Beatz
Songs written by 6ix9ine
Songs written by Consequence (rapper)
Songs written by Kanye West
Songs written by Murda Beatz
Songs written by Ant Clemons